FRBC may refer to:
Forge Road Bible Chapel, Perry Hall, Maryland
Franklin Road Baptist Church, Murfreesboro, Tennessee
Flint River Baptist Church, Hazel Green, Alabama
French Racing and Breeding Committee, a nonprofit organisation entrusted with the promotion of the French horse racing and breeding industry abroad